Cherepanov as a surname may refer to

 Alexander Andreyevich Cherepanov (1837–1886), Russian general
 Aleksandr Cherepanov (general) (1895–1984), Soviet general
 Alexander Leonidovich Cherepanov (born 1967), Russian general
 Alexei Cherepanov (1989–2008), Russian ice hockey player
 Sergey Cherepanov (born 1986), Kazakhstani cross-country skier
 Yefim Alekseyevich Cherepanov (1774–1842) and Miron Yefimovich Cherepanov (1803–1849), Russian inventors and industrial engineers, father and son